In China, before Mao Zedong and the communists took power, the Shanghai Commune of 1927 was created as a grassroots movement by the workers of Shanghai. It was created after a massive rebellion overthrew the local warlord. However, this movement was crushed on April 12, 1927, when Chiang Kai-shek entered the city in the Shanghai massacre of 1927.

See also
The Shanghai People's Commune established during the Cultural Revolution.

1927 in China
1920s in Shanghai
Communism in China
Military history of Shanghai